Vusal Afras ogly Gasimli is an Azerbaijani economist serving as the Executive director of the Center for Economic Reforms Analysis and Communication of the Republic of Azerbaijan (since 2016), was the Head of Economic Analysis and Global Affairs Department of the Center for Strategic Studies under the President of Azerbaijan (2011-2016), and the President of "ANS-PRESS" Publishing House (2005-2007). Since 2021 he was appointed Focal Point of UNESCAP. He is the author of more than 10 books and 500 scientific works on economics in Azerbaijani, Russian, English, and Korean.

Biography
Vusal Gasimli was born in Imishli on 7 April 1975. He is married, with three children.

Education 
Gasimli received his primary and secondary education in high school #34 of Imishli. 
He entered the Azerbaijan State University of Economics in 1993 (with the highest score), and received his Masters degree in Economics in 1997. 
After graduation, Gasimli continued his education at Georgian Institute of Public Affairs in Tbilisi and received a master's degree in Journalism in 2004 (based on the study program of Louisiana State University ).

In 2009 Gasimli was awarded the degree of PhD in Economics, and in 2017 he was awarded the title of Doctor of Science in Economics. Being a results-driven researcher with a strong background in macroeconomics, his studies are focused on economic development, competitiveness, modernization, and geoeconomics.
In 2013 he was given the title of associate professor, and in 2021 was promoted to Professor.

In 2021 he earned a certificate of completion for the "Leading Economic Growth" Program, at the John F. Kennedy School of Government at Harvard University.  
In 2022-2023 he completed the Oxford University Postgraduate Diploma in Strategy and Innovation.
He is fluent in Azerbaijani, English, Turkish and Russian, and has an elementary knowledge of Spanish.

Scientific activity 
In 2010-2014, Gasimli was engaged in pedagogical activities at the UNEC Special Talent Group and MBA program. He delivered public lectures at the Washington University in St. Louis, University of California, The American University in Cairo, University of Warsaw, Università Cattolica del Sacro Cuore, Hanyang University, Hankuk University of Foreign Studies, and Rio de Janeiro State University. In 2013, he was also employed by KIEP as a visiting professor.

In 2012, Gasimli received the award of Astana Economic Forum for his outstanding research achievements.

His book, Geoeconomics, a work highly estimated by the world scientific society, was published in 2015. Commenting on the book, the professor of King's College London, Friedbert Pflüger noted that "Gasimli created a unique concept of geoeconomics".

Career 
From 2005 to 2007 Gasimli was the President of "ANS-PRESS" Publishing House. In 2007-2011, he consulted on the projects of The European Union, World Bank, JICA, and other intergovernmental organizations. In 2011, he was appointed the Head of Economic Analysis and Global Affairs Department of the Center for Strategic Studies under the President of Azerbaijan. He participated in the sessions of the UNIDO. Gasimli joined the T20 network (Think Tanks from G20 countries) as a representative of Azerbaijan in 2015.

In 2016, he became an economic development consultant for the Asian Development Bank. According to the final decision of the meeting held by the Supervisory Board of the Center for Economic Reforms Analysis and Communication, on May 2, 2016, Vusal Gasimli was appointed the Executive director of the Center.

Since 2021 Vusal Gasimli is the Focal Point of UNESCAP.

He is also a member of the government commission established on the basis of the Order of the President of the Republic of Azerbaijan dated July 13, 2016 No. 2199 "On additional measures to improve the business environment in the Republic of Azerbaijan and further improvement of the position of our country in international rankings". For his achievements in this field, in 2018, Ilham Aliyev awarded Gasimli the Taraggi Medal.

References

External links 
 
 
 Geo-economics by Vusal Gasimli
 Modernization of Azerbaijan economy: The role of transnational companies by Vusal Gasimli
 Resource-rich Countries: Modernization and Diversification: The case of Azerbaijan by Vusal Gasimli
 The impact of some key factors on labour productivity in European countries by Vusal Gasimli

1975 births
Living people
21st-century Azerbaijani economists
People from Imishli
Azerbaijan State University of Economics alumni
Recipients of the Tereggi Medal